Frank Aloysius McCue (October 4, 1898 – July 5, 1953) was an American professional baseball player. He played two games in Major League Baseball for the Philadelphia Athletics in 1922 as a third baseman.

References

Major League Baseball third basemen
Philadelphia Athletics players
Moline Plowboys players
Norfolk Tars players
Kinston Eagles players
York White Roses players
Williamsport Grays players
Baseball players from Illinois
1898 births
1953 deaths